Pavel Dubitskiy (born 27 August 1982) is a retired Kazakhstani athlete competing in the decathlon and indoor heptathlon. He won multiple medals at the regional level.

He has personal bests of 7693 points in the decathlon and 5634 points in the heptathlon, both from 2003.

Competition record

References
 

1982 births
Sportspeople from Kokshetau
Living people
Kazakhstani decathletes
Athletes (track and field) at the 2006 Asian Games
Asian Games competitors for Kazakhstan